Kuvehi (also Romanized as Kūveh’ī; also known as Kovā’ī, Kovāy, Kowey, Kūbeh’ī, Kūveh, and Kūve’ī) is a village in Howmeh Rural District, in the Central District of Qeshm County, Hormozgan Province, Iran. At the 2006 census, its population was 3,422, in 716 families.

References 

Populated places in Qeshm County